John Leslie Turner (born November 30, 1967) is an American former professional basketball player.

Professional career
Turner was selected by the Houston Rockets in the 1st round (20th overall) of the 1991 NBA Draft, playing for the side in the NBA for one season.
During the 1991-92 NBA season, he appeared in 42 games, averaging 2.8 points per game. 
At the end of the season, in August 1992, the Rockets agreed to release Turner so he could go to Spain to play for CAI Zaragoza.

References

External links
Serie A profile  Retrieved 11 August 2015
NBA stats @ basketballreference.com
Spanish league stats 

1967 births
Living people
African-American basketball players
Allegany Trojans men's basketball players
American expatriate basketball people in Italy
American expatriate basketball people in New Zealand
American expatriate basketball people in Spain
American men's basketball players
Basketball players from Washington, D.C.
Basket Livorno players
Basket Napoli players
CB Zaragoza players
Fabriano Basket players
Georgetown Hoyas men's basketball players
Harbour Heat players
Houston Rockets draft picks
Houston Rockets players
Lega Basket Serie A players
Liga ACB players
Mens Sana Basket players
Olimpia Basket Pistoia players
Pallacanestro Virtus Roma players
People from Greenbelt, Maryland
Phillips University alumni
Phillips Haymakers men's basketball players
Power forwards (basketball)
Sutor Basket Montegranaro players
21st-century African-American people
20th-century African-American sportspeople